Cardiff Celts Volleyball Club is a volleyball club based in Cardiff, South Wales. The club has lots of mini junior boys and girls teams and one women's teams playing in the South West England Regional League, as well as junior teams competing locally in the South Wales League. The club was formed as the result of the merger between Cardiff Tigers volleyball club and Bridgend volleyball club.

References

External links 
 Cardiff Celts VC website 

British volleyball clubs
Sport in Cardiff
Volleyball in Wales